The Dobra Bridge is located between Karlovac and Novigrad interchanges of the A1 motorway in Croatia, spanning Dobra River.

Construction work on the Dobra Bridge started in 1999 and was completed in 2001. Cost of the construction work was 57 million Croatian kuna (7.7 million euro). During the construction there was one major incident: on 1 July 2000, three girders plummeted from the main span piers into the river below. The incident did not cause any injury and damage was reported to be marginal.

Description
The deck structure stretches across 13 spans. Foundations of the bridge are executed on piles.

Traffic volume
Traffic is regularly counted and reported by Autocesta Rijeka – Zagreb, operator of the bridge and the part of the A1 motorway where the bridge is located, and published by Hrvatske ceste. Substantial variations between annual (AADT) and summer (ASDT) traffic volumes are attributed to the fact that the bridge carries substantial tourist traffic to the Dalmatian Adriatic resorts. The traffic count is performed using analysis of motorway toll ticket sales.

See also
List of bridges by length

References

External links
Autocesta Rijeka–Zagreb: Dobra Bridge webcam

Plate girder bridges
Bridges completed in 2001
Toll bridges in Croatia
Buildings and structures in Karlovac County
Transport in Karlovac County